General Skinner may refer to:

Bruce Skinner (1858–1932), British Army major general
Robert J. Skinner (fl. 1980s–2020s), U.S. Air Force lieutenant general
Thomson J. Skinner (1752–1809), Continental Army major general
William Skinner (British Army officer) (1700–1780), British Army lieutenant general
William Skinner (North Carolina general) (1728–1798), North Carolina Militia brigadier general in the American Revolutionary War

See also
Attorney General Skinner (disambiguation)